Grays Point is an extinct town in Scott County, in the U.S. state of Missouri. 

Variant names were "Graysboro" and "Ross Point". A post office called Graysboro was established in 1898, and remained in operation until 1907. The community has the name of William Gray, a pioneer citizen.

References

Ghost towns in Missouri
Former populated places in Scott County, Missouri